At the 1912 Summer Olympics in Stockholm, four diving events were contested.  For the first time, women competed in diving at the Olympic Games. The competitions were held from Saturday 6 July 1912 to Monday 15 July 1912.

Medal summary
The events are labelled as 10 metre platform, 3 metre springboard and plain high diving by the International Olympic Committee, and appeared on the 1912 Official Report as Plain and Variety Diving combined, Spring-board Diving and High (plain) Diving.  The high diving events included dives from both 10 metre and 5 metre platforms, while the springboard diving included dives from 3 metre and 1 metre springboards.

Men

Women

Participating nations
A total of 57 divers (43 men and 14 women) from 10 nations (men from 9 nations - women from 3 nations) competed at the Stockholm Games:

  (men:0 women:1)
  (men:2 women:0)
  (men:6 women:0)
  (men:4 women:0)
  (men:2 women:1)
  (men:1 women:0)
  (men:3 women:0)
  (men:1 women:0)
  (men:22 women:12)
  (men:2 women:0)

Medal table

Notes

References
 
 

 
1912 Summer Olympics events
1912
1912 in water sports
1912 in diving